Seyyed Mohammad Bazar (also Romanized as Seyyed Moḩammad Bāzār; also known as Seyyed Moḩammadābād) is a village in Kahir Rural District, in the Central District of Konarak County, Sistan and Baluchestan Province, Iran. At the 2006 census, its population was 305, in 59 families.

References 

Populated places in Konarak County